Parincea is a commune in Bacău County, Western Moldavia, Romania. It is composed of ten villages: Barna, Mileștii de Jos, Mileștii de Sus, Nănești, Năstăseni, Parincea, Poieni, Satu Nou, Văleni and Vladnic.

References

Communes in Bacău County
Localities in Western Moldavia